Alan Woods may refer to:
 Alan Woods (footballer) (1937–2021), English football player
 Alan Woods (gambler) (1945–2008), Australian professional gambler who bet on blackjack and horse races
 Alan Woods (political theorist) (born 1944), Trotskyist political theorist
 Alan Woods (priest) (born 1942), retired Anglican dean
 Alan Woods (public servant) (1930–1990), senior Australian public servant
 Alan Woods (soccer) (born 1978), American soccer (football) defender
 Alan Woods (The Bill), character in British police television series

See also
 Al Woods (disambiguation)
 Alan Wood (disambiguation)
 Allan Woods (1906–1968), Australian rugby league player
 Allan Wood (born 1943), Australian swimmer